Beach games are games played on the beach. Beach games may refer to:

 ANOC World Beach Games
African Beach Games
Asian Beach Games
 Mediterranean Beach Games
 South American Beach Games
 South Asian Beach Games

See also

 Games (disambiguation)
 Beach (disambiguation)
 
 Beach volleyball at the Olympics